Hot pot is a dish or style of cooking from China, Taiwan, and southeast Asia.

Hot pot may also refer to:
 Jeongol, a Korean hot pot
 Karelian hot pot
 Lancashire hotpot, a traditional English stew of meat, potatoes and vegetables
 Nabemono, a Japanese hot pot
 Shabu-shabu, a Japanese dish in the hot pot style
 Hodge-Podge (soup)
 Hot Pot Music, a record label
 Everybody Speaks Nonsenses II – Hot Pot, a Taiwanese TV show 
 A brand of electric kettle
 For the style of "hot pot" cooking that uses a clay pot, see Clay pot cooking
 Hot spring